Sir Thomas Miller, 1st Baronet may refer to:

Sir Thomas Miller, 1st Baronet of Chichester (c. 1635–1705), MP for Chichester 1689–1695
Thomas Miller, Lord Glenlee (1717–1789), 1st Baronet of Glenlee, Scottish politician and judge, Member of Parliament 1761–66

See also
Thomas Miller (disambiguation)